Acetilactobacillus jinshanensis is a species of lactic acid bacteria.

References

Lactobacillaceae
Bacteria described in 2020